Orris Sanford Ferry (August 15, 1823 – November 21, 1875) was a Republican American lawyer and politician from Connecticut who served in the United States House of Representatives and the United States Senate. He was also a brigadier general in the Union Army during the American Civil War.

Early life
Ferry was born on August 15, 1823 in Bethel, Connecticut. He attended the Hopkins School, and worked at his father's shoe factory as a boy. It was here that he realized his love of books. At age 17, Ferry entered Yale, where he served as one of the editors of the Yale Literary Magazine and was a member of Skull and Bones.  He graduated in 1844. Ferry first settled in Fairfield, Connecticut, where he studied law under Thomas B. Osborne. He then settled in Norwalk, Connecticut, and served in the office of Thomas B. Butler. Ferry married Charlotte Bissell, the daughter of Governor Clark Bissell. He was admitted to the bar in 1846. The following year, he was commissioned a lieutenant colonel in the 12th Regiment of Connecticut Militia. During his time in the militia, Ferry did not fight in any battle or war.

Early political career
Ferry served as a probate judge soon after being admitted to the bar. At age 32, he was elected to a term in the Connecticut Senate representing the 12th District. He then served as the State's Attorney for Fairfield County from 1856 to 1859. Ferry was a member of the Toleration Party, but in 1856 became a Republican. After joining the party, he campaigned for John C. Frémont. In 1857, Ferry was nominated to serve in the United States House of Representatives, but lost the election. In 1859, he was again nominated, and this time he won.

House of Representatives
During his time in Congress, Ferry was known for extemporaneous speaking. He gave numerous speeches against slavery. Ferry was chosen as Connecticut's representative to the Committee of Thirty-Three. This Committee was created in the hopes that peace could be settled between the Northern and Southern states. However, Southern states continued to secede from the Union, and the committee was disbanded. Ferry also served on the Committee of Revolutionary Claims. In 1861, he was renominated for his seat, but lost the election.

American Civil War
At the outbreak of the American Civil War, and before regiments of Northern troops had arrived to defend Washington, there was a report of a plot to burn the capital. On April 18, 1861 this report mobilized loyal citizens, including Ferry, and state senator A. Homer Byington, also of Norwalk, to form a militia. This militia was led by Cassius Marcellus Clay, and came to be known as the Cassius Clay Guard.

On July 23, 1861 he was put in command of the 5th Connecticut Volunteer Infantry, and given the rank of colonel. The original regiment was the 1st Regiment Colts Revolving Rifles of Connecticut and was supposed to be led by Samuel Colt, but the unit never took the field. Its organization failing, the regiment was reorganized in May 1861. In early March 1862, Ferry led his troops across the Potomac River, and attacked the Confederates at Winchester, Virginia. This action would later lead to what became the First Battle of Winchester. Ferry was well praised for his ability as a leader and as a military strategist. Ferry was promoted to brigadier general on March 17, 1862. He was then put under the command of General James Shields, whose division joined that of Gen. Irvin McDowell. It was under McDowell that Ferry fought at the First Battle of Winchester. Ferry continued to serve under Shields, during the Valley Campaign.

Battle of Cedar Mountain

Shortly after the First Battle of Winchester, Ferry and the 5th Connecticut Infantry were put under the command of Maj. Gen. Nathaniel Banks. On August 9, Ferry, under Banks, encountered Stonewall Jackson at the Battle of Cedar Mountain. The Union troops attacked to gain early advantage, but a Confederate counterattack repulsed Banks's corps and won the day. Later that day, Union reinforcements under Maj. Gen. John Pope arrived. This led to a two-day stand-off between the two armies. The battle ended in a Confederate victory.

Services and resignation
During the war, Ferry served in the VII Corps, X Corps, and XVIII Corps. He was also the head of the District of Lehigh, from August 20, 1863 until May 1864, and served as the head of the District of Philadelphia from December 16, 1864 until July 15, 1865. Ferry was brevetted a major general of volunteers in recognition of his services during the Peninsula Campaign. He resigned from the military on July 15, 1865. His resignation followed the Confederate surrender.

Senate career
After the Civil War, Ferry returned to both his political career and law practice. In 1866, he ran against Lafayette S. Foster, the current incumbent of the Class III Connecticut Senate seat. Ferry won the election, and took his place in the U.S. Senate on March 4, 1867. He became very active in committees, and favored amnesty for members of the Confederacy. Ferry participated in the Impeachment of President Andrew Johnson, voting to convict. In 1869, Ferry was attacked by a rare disease of his spine. This disease led to a slow deterioration of his spine. This slowed his workings in the Senate, but he continued to play an active role. From 1870 to 1871, he served as the chairman of the Committee to Audit and Control the Contingent Expenses. From 1871 to 1875, he was chairman of the Committee on Patents. Ferry also served on the United States Senate Committee on Health, Education, Labor, and Pensions. Ferry was considered a Liberal Republican, but he declined to officially associate with the breakaway party. In 1872, Ferry was reelected for a second term. His main supporters were Democrats and Liberal Republicans.

Alexander Caldwell scandal
In 1871, Alexander Caldwell was elected to the Senate from Kansas. From the start, allegations of corruption and pay-offs emerged.
In 1873, Congressman Sidney Clarke, who assisted in Caldwell's election, testified that Caldwell's campaign had claimed that it would pay $250,000 to secure the election. Kansas Governor Thomas Carney testified that he was paid $15,000 to drop out of the race. An investigation followed; its final report asked the Senate to expel Caldwell for not being "duly and legally elected". On March 21, 1873, Ferry took to the floor of the Senate and gave a speech asking the Senate to expel Caldwell: "The crime of bribery goes down to the very foundations of the institutions under which we live. We all know it and ... we shall stifle our consciences if we do not vote to expel." After a survey of the Senate, Caldwell saw his inevitability of being expelled, and resigned, on March 23.

Later Senate career
In 1874, Ferry gave a speech against the future Civil Rights Act of 1875. After speaking, Senator Charles Sumner, both a friend of Ferry's and the proposer of the bill, stood up and said, "Mr. Ferry, your speech is far the most damaging blow my measure has yet received". The Civil Rights Act would eventually pass, but was deemed unconstitutional by the Supreme Court, on the basis that Congress did not have the power to regulate the conduct of individuals. His last speech in Congress was considered an uncommonly eloquent dissertation on his former friend, William Alfred Buckingham.

Death
After his final speech, Ferry left the capital for a new medical treatment. The treatment was to help heal his decaying spine, but the procedure failed. On November 20, 1875 Ferry's friends and doctors helped take him home. He died of his spine disease the next day. His funeral was attended by dignitaries such as Schurz. Ferry was interred at Union Cemetery in Norwalk.

See also

List of American Civil War generals (Union)
List of United States representatives from Connecticut
List of United States senators from Connecticut
List of United States Congress members who died in office (1790–1899)

Notes

References
 Croffut, William Augustus, Morris, John Moses; The military and civil history of Connecticut during the war of 1861-65: comprising a detailed account of the various regiments and batteries, through march, encampment, bivouac, and battle; also instances of distinguished personal gallantry, and biographical sketches of many heroic soldiers..., Ledyard Bill, 1869
 Eicher, John H., Eicher, David J.; Civil War High Commands, Stanford University Press, 2001, 
 Grossman, Mark;  Political corruption in America: an encyclopedia of scandals, power, and greed, ABC-CLIO, 2003 
History of Battle-Flag Day, September 17, 1879, Lockwood & Merritt, 1879
 Hutchins, Edward Ridgeway; The War of the Sixties, The Neale Publishing Co., 1912
 McDonald, William N., A History of the Laurel Brigade, 1907.
 Obituary of Orris S. Ferry
  Retrieved on 2008-02-12
 Orris S. Ferry Obituary in the New York Times, November 22 1875
 Salmon, John S., The Official Virginia Civil War Battlefield Guide, Stackpole Books, 2001, .
 Warner, Ezra J.; Generals in Blue: Lives of the Union Commanders, LSU Press, 1964, 
 Williams, H. Clay; Biographical encyclopaedia of Connecticut and Rhode Island of the nineteenth century, Metropolitan Pub. and Engraving Co., 1881

External links
 
 Orris S. Ferry Obituary in the New York Times, November 22 1875

|-

1823 births
1875 deaths
Connecticut Liberal Republicans
Connecticut state senators
Hopkins School alumni
Liberal Republican Party United States senators
Lawyers from Fairfield, Connecticut
Politicians from Norwalk, Connecticut
People of Connecticut in the American Civil War
Republican Party United States senators from Connecticut
Union Army generals
Yale College alumni
Military personnel from Connecticut
Republican Party members of the United States House of Representatives from Connecticut
19th-century American politicians
19th-century American lawyers